William Wirt Virgin (September 18, 1823 – January 23, 1893) was an American politician and jurist from Maine.

Early life and education
Virgin was born in 1823 in Rumford, Maine and graduated from Bowdoin College in 1844. He was admitted to the Maine bar in 1847 and moved to Norway, Maine, where practiced law until 1871.

Career
During the American Civil War, Virgin raised the 23rd Maine Volunteer Infantry Regiment, which consisted of five companies from Oxford County and Androscoggin Counties. The Regiment did not see combat, instead acting as a guard of Washington D.C.
 
Virgin, a Republican, served two one-year terms in the Maine Senate (1865, 1866). In his 2nd and final term, Virgin served as the Senate President. In 1872, Virgin was appointed to the Maine Supreme Judicial Court as an associate justice. He served in that position until his death on January 23, 1893.

References

1823 births
1893 deaths
Bowdoin College alumni
Maine lawyers
People from Rumford, Maine
People from Norway, Maine
People of Maine in the American Civil War
Presidents of the Maine Senate
Republican Party Maine state senators
Justices of the Maine Supreme Judicial Court
19th-century American politicians
19th-century American judges
19th-century American lawyers